Ng Wing Yung (born 17 May 1995) is a Hong Kong badminton player. She, partnered with Chang Tak Ching, participated in the 2021 BWF World Championships' mixed doubles event, and defeated the top seed, the defending champions Zheng Siwei and Huang Yaqiong in the second round by 16–21, 21–13, 21–17.

Achievements

BWF International Challenge/Series (1 title, 6 runners-up) 
Women's doubles

Mixed doubles

  BWF International Challenge tournament
  BWF International Series tournament
  BWF Future Series tournament

References

External links 
 

1995 births
Living people
Hong Kong female badminton players
Badminton players at the 2018 Asian Games
Asian Games competitors for Hong Kong
21st-century Hong Kong women